This is a list of all the recorded matches played by the Bhutan national football team, which represents Bhutan in international men's football. Bhutan play their home games at the national stadium, Changlimithang. It is one of the younger national teams in the world having played its first match in 1982.

1980s
Some sources suggest that Bhutan regularly sent international teams to compete in tournaments abroad from the 1960s. However, it is not known the extent to which these were genuinely international teams or merely representative teams, as many of the players are said not to have been of Bhutanese origin. Regardless of their nature, none of the results of any of these hinted at tournaments are known, with the first recorded instance of Bhutan playing an international match being against Nepal in the ANFA Cup in 1982. After this match, the team regularly participated in the football tournaments held as part of the South Asian Games, however, they were generally unsuccessful and indeed failed to score a competitive goal against international opposition between 1982 and 1987.

1982

1984

1985

1986

1987

1990s
Following their regular appearances at the South Asian Games during the 1980s, Bhutan disappeared completely from the international stage for some twelve years resurfacing only at the end of the 1990s to compete again at the South Asian Games. Their time away from competitive football had done nothing to strengthen the team as they lost all of their games at the tournament for a fourth consecutive time.

1999

2000s

2000
Following nearly twenty years of competition restricted to South Asia, Bhutan entered a continental competition for the first time, competing in the qualifying rounds for the AFC Asian Cup. This series of matches was arguably the nadir of Bhutanese football as they lost heavily not only against relative minnows Yemen and Turkmenistan, but suffered the ignominy of a then world record 20–0 defeat to Kuwait.

2001

2002

Just over twenty years since their debut on the international stage, Bhutan recorded their first win, a victory over Montserrat in a game organised by a Dutch advertising agency, and sanctioned by FIFA to coincide with the 2002 FIFA World Cup Final.

2003
They were unable initially to continue this form into the next edition of the SAFF Championship, but following a disappointing performance in those games, they were comparatively successful in the preliminary round of Qualifying for the AFC Asian Cup. Hosting Guam and Mongolia, they recorded a 6–0 win over Guam and a 0–0 draw with Mongolia to set a new record victory margin the first time that the side gained positive results in two consecutive competitive games and their best set of results until the two victories over Sri Lanka in 2015. They qualified for the next round where they were outclassed in all games by stronger opposition.

2005

2006
Bhutan gained only their third positive competitive result, and their first in the AFC Challenge Cup in a 0–0 draw with Brunei, although this was not enough to see them through to the next stage.

2007
Two friendly games against Tibet saw Bhutan gain a win and a draw from two matches for only the second time in their history. However, although these matches are counted in the official Elo ratings, Tibet are not a member of FIFA and so these matches do not count in the official FIFA rankings.

2008
A further creditable 1–1 draw was gained against Brunei in an otherwise unsuccessful AFC Challenge Cup qualification campaign. However, later in the year Bhutan achieved arguably their best ever performance in an official competition, reaching the semi finals of the SAFF Championships, beating Afghanistan in their group stage before losing ultimately to India in the semi finals to a last minute goal in extra time.

2009

2010s
Having lost their last eight games in a row, their successes in the SAFF Championships were now a distant memory and matters have not improved in the years since, their losing run stretched to nineteen games. However, following an eighteen-month absence from the international arena and entering the World Cup for the very first time, Bhutan produced two shock results in beating Sri Lanka in both legs of the AFC first qualifying round to proceed to the group qualifying round and record back to back victories for the first time in their history. The next stage of qualifying was not successful for Bhutan as they lost all of their matches including a 15–0 defeat to Qatar and a 12–0 defeat to China in addition to an overall 15–0 loss to Thai club side Buriram United in two unofficial back to back friendlies. A fourteen match losing streak was broken however when they drew 0–0 with Bangladesh in the first leg of their 2019 AFC Asian Cup qualification – Play-off Round tie. The second leg saw Bhutan record their first ever victory over Bangladesh in a 3–1 win, which saw them progress to the third round of the qualifiers for the 2019 Asian Cup.

2011

2012

2013

2015

2016

2017

2018

2019

Summary record

By venue

By year
As at 31 March 2016:

By competition
As at 10 February 2016:

By opponent
As at 6 September 2016:

Competitive record

FIFA World Cup
Bhutan attempted to qualify for the FIFA World Cup for the first time in 2015. Drawn against Sri Lanka, they produced a shock result over the two legs of the first round to progress to the next round. They were drawn in group C of the second round, but were unable to progress to the next stage.

AFC Asian Cup
Prior to 2015, Bhutan had only attempted to qualify for the AFC Asian Cup on two occasions, both of which ended unsuccessfully. In their first attempt, they lost all of their matches, including a then world record 20–0 defeat to Kuwait. They were marginally more successful in the next iteration. Qualifying was divided into two stages. Bhutan hosted their group in the Preliminary stage, finishing in first place after a 0–0 draw with Mongolia and a 6–0 victory over Guam, a result that is still a record win for the nation. However, progressing to the second stage, they lost all six of their games and failed to progress to the competition proper. for the 2019 AFC Asian Cup, the qualifying rounds for the 2018 FIFA World Cup were used as the first two stages of qualifying for this competition. Bhutan were eliminated in the second round of World Cup qualifying and entered the play-off round where they were drawn against Bangladesh. Bhutan beat them 3–1 over two legs to progress to the third round of qualifying for the first time.

AFC Challenge Cup
Bhutan have a dismal record in the AFC Challenge Cup, not only have they never qualified for the competition, but they have only managed a single draw, 1–1 against Brunei during the 2008 qualifying campaign. In addition, this is the only match in which they have ever managed to score. The AFC Challenge Cup has been discontinued by the AFC, with all nations now entering qualifying for the AFC Cup due to the expansion of the Asian Cup to the 24-nation format from the 16-nation one after the 2015 edition.

South Asian Football Federation Cup
Bhutan have an almost equally poor record in the South Asian Football Federation Cup. Only once have they managed to make it out of the group stage of the competition, with this being the only time they have managed to achieve any form of positive result.

South Asian Games
Early in their competitive history, Bhutan's sole participation in international football was their attendance at the South Asian Games. Taking part in the first three editions of the games, they failed to win a single game, losing all their matches and failing to score a goal until their final group game in 1987 against Nepal. Following this edition they did not enter a team again and from 2004 the national team has been ineligible as the tournament was changed to an under-23 competition.

ANFA Cup
The ANFA Cup refers to a series of invitational association football knockout tournaments organised by the All Nepal Football Association. A national team has represented Bhutan at a number of editions of this tournament. Some of the matches have been against other national teams with the remainder against clubs or other representative teams. Again they have struggled to achieve any real success, their only positive results coming in 1986 in non-international matches against teams representing the Hong Kong Gurkhas and Nepal Youth respectively.

*Denotes draws includes knockout matches decided on penalty kicks. Red border indicates that the tournament was hosted on home soil. Gold, silver, bronze backgrounds indicates 1st, 2nd and 3rd finishes respectively. Bold text indicates best finish in tournament.

References

External links

 Men's senior all-time record and Elo rating
 Bhutan – List of men's senior international matches at RSSSF